John Lunn Newman (12 November 1916 – 14 February 1974) was a British athlete. He competed in the men's high jump at the 1936 Summer Olympics.

Newman also served in the Royal Air Force during the Second World War.

References

1916 births
1974 deaths
Athletes (track and field) at the 1936 Summer Olympics
British male high jumpers
Olympic athletes of Great Britain
People from Rochester, Kent
Royal Air Force personnel of World War II